Fort Buchanan is the name of two United States Army forts:

 Fort Buchanan, Arizona, is a former United States Army base in Arizona to control land purchased in the Gadsden Purchase
 Fort Buchanan, Puerto Rico is the only active U.S. Army installation in the Caribbean, home of the 1st Mission Support Command.